Ushinara was an ancient Indo-Aryan tribe of north-western South Asia whose existence is attested during the Iron Age.

Location

History
The Uśīnaras, as well as the neighbouring Kekaya and Madraka tribes, were descended from the Ṛgvedic Anu tribe which lived near the Paruṣṇī river in the central Punjab region.

A queen of Uśīnara, named Uśīnarāṇī, is mentioned in the Ṛgveda.

In mythology

References

Further reading

Ancient peoples of India